Ruthless is a 1948 American drama film directed by Edgar G. Ulmer starring Zachary Scott, Sydney Greenstreet and Louis Hayward.

Plot
Horace Vendig shows himself to the world as a rich philanthropist. In fact, the history of his rise from his unhappy broken home shows this to be far from true. After being taken in by richer neighbors he started to exhibit an obsessive and selfish urge to make more and more money, loving and leaving women at will to further this end.

Cast
 Zachary Scott as Horace Vendig
 Louis Hayward as Vic Lambdin
 Diana Lynn as Martha / Mallory
 Sydney Greenstreet as Mansfield
 Lucille Bremer as Christa Mansfield
 Martha Vickers as Susan Duane
 Dennis Hoey as Mr. Burnside
 Edith Barrett as Mrs. Burnside
 Raymond Burr as Peter Vendig
 Joyce Arling as Kate Vendig
 Charles Evans as Bruce McDonald
 Bob Anderson as Horace as a child 
 Arthur Stone as Vic as a child
 Ann Carter as Martha as a child
 Edna Holland as Libby Sims
 Frederick Worlock as J. Norton Sims
 Claire Carleton as Bella
 Larry Steers as Dinner Attendee (uncredited)

Critical reception
At the time of its release, the staff at Variety magazine panned the film: "Despite a sextet of name players, Ruthless is a victim of clichéd and outmoded direction and of weary dialog to which no actor could do justice. Performances are handicapped by the direction of Edgar G. Ulmer. Adaptation from the Dayton Stoddart novel, Prelude to Night, is involved and confusing. Plot’s denouement is also telegraphed long before the finale. Hayward contribs a fair interpretation of Scott’s associate, who eventually breaks from him. Diana Lynn, in a dual role, is wistful and appealing as a pawn in Scott’s affections. Sydney Greenstreet, cast as a utilities magnate who’s ousted by Scott, tends to overact."

In 2013, film critic Glenn Erickson gave the film a positive review, writing, "Financed as a one-shot project by an agent-turned producer, Ruthless plays its quietly subversive theme right out to the bitter end. It has excellent performances by a cast of not-quite big stars, some of them recently relieved of studio contracts. Its main player is the biggest surprise: Zachary Scott gives the performance of his career ... Ruthless is the Edgar G. Ulmer picture that shows him operating with a decent set of cinematic Tinkertoys, and he does very well indeed."

References

External links

 
 
 
 

1948 films
1948 drama films
Adultery in films
American business films
American drama films
American black-and-white films
Eagle-Lion Films films
Film noir
Films about businesspeople
Films based on American novels
Films directed by Edgar G. Ulmer
Films scored by Werner Janssen
1940s English-language films
1940s American films